This is a list of the stations of the metro system of Bilbao, Basque Country, Spain. For further information on the network, see the Metro Bilbao page.

The system is one line in the city centre (Ariz - San Ignazio) which splits into two branches northwest of downtown.

Common stations

Terminal stations in bold
Etxebarri - terminus station for Line 1 and link between the two lines.
Bolueta - link with EuskoTren to Bermeo and Donostia.
Basarrate
Santutxu
Zazpikaleak/Casco Viejo - link with EuskoTren to Deusto and Lezama.
Abando - link with the tram and Cercanías, Bilbao-Abando station.
Moyua
Indautxu
Santimami/San Mamés - link with the tram, Cercanías and the bus station.
Deustu
Sarriko
San Ignazio - link between lines 1 and 2.

Line One 

Terminal stations in bold
Etxebarri - Plentzia
Lutxana
Erandio
Astrabudua
Leioa
Lamiako
Areeta
Gobela
Neguri
Aiboa
Algorta
Bidezabal 
Ibarbengoa
Berango
Larrabasterra
Sopela
Urduliz
Plentzia

Line Two

Terminal stations in bold
Basauri - Kabiezes
Basauri (before the common line)
Ariz (before the common line)
Gurutzeta/Cruces
Ansio
Barakaldo
Bagatza
Urbinaga
Sestao
Abatxolo
Portugalete
Peñota
Santurtzi
 Mamariga shuttle
Kabiezes

Line Three

See also
Metro Bilbao

External links
Metro Bilbao

Bilbao
Bilbao metro
 
Bilbao